Wallace W. Kirby (1881–1962) was an officer of the United States Army who served as Director of the Bureau of Engraving and Printing in 1924.

Biography

Wallace W. Kirby was born in 1881 and raised in Washington, D.C.  After school, he went into the printing business.  In 1900, he joined the United States Geological Survey.  

During World War I, Kirby was commissioned as an officer in the United States Army and assigned to the United States Army Corps of Engineers, where he was responsible for map reproduction activities.  While serving with expeditionary forces in France, Kirby commanded the 29th Engineers, a unit of surveying and map-making experts.

In February 1924, President of the United States Calvin Coolidge named Kirby Director of the Bureau of Engraving and Printing.  Because Kirby was a member of the military, he was not eligible to hold this office, so the United States Congress passed a joint resolution to allow Kirby to hold this office for six months without resigning his military commission.  

After his time as Director of the Bureau of Engraving and Printing, Kirby returned to the Engineer Reproduction Plant in Washington, D.C.

Kirby left the Army in 1927, forming a printing company in Arlington, Virginia that he ran until his death in 1962.

References

1881 births
1962 deaths
United States Department of the Treasury officials
United States Army officers
People from Washington, D.C.
United States Army personnel of World War I
Coolidge administration personnel